Zanclognatha reticulatis is a species of litter moth of the family Erebidae. It was described by John Henry Leech in 1900. It is found in Taiwan, Japan and the Kuriles.

References

reticulatis
Moths described in 1900
Moths of Japan
Moths of Asia
Moths of Taiwan
Taxa named by John Henry Leech